Mahua Sarkar is a historical sociologist. She is Professor of Sociology, and Women, Gender and Sexuality Studies at Binghamton University], SUNY. During the 2016-17 academic year, she was France-ILO chair at the Institut des Etudes Avancées in Nantes, France. In 2011-12, she was fellow at Re:Work, the Work and Human Life Cycle in Global History institute at Humboldt University, Berlin,> and in 2013-14 she was EURIAS fellow] at the Wissenschaftskolleg Berlin.

Books 
Sarkar is the author or editor of:
Mahua Sarkar (ed.) Work Out of Place (2017)
Mahua Sarkar, Visible Histories, Disappearing Women: Producing Muslim Womanhood in Late Colonial Bengal (2008).

References

Women sociologists